Charles Edward Cheney (February 12, 1836 – November 15, 1916) was an American clergyman and second bishop of the Reformed Episcopal Church.

Life 
Charles E. Cheney was born in Canandaigua, New York on February 12, 1836. A graduate of Hobart College in Geneva, New York, he studied at Virginia Theological Seminary before ordination to the diaconate and priesthood by William Heathcote DeLancey in 1858 and 1859 respectively. Soon after his ordination he became rector of Christ Church, Chicago, where he served from 1860 until his death in 1916.

Cheney's opposition to the baptismal regeneration of infants resulted in ecclesiastical censure by Bishop Henry J. Whitehouse of Chicago. Cheney was consecrated bishop by George David Cummins at Christ Church, Chicago, Illinois, on December 14, 1873. He succeeded Cummins as Presiding Bishop of the Reformed Episcopal Church, serving in this capacity from 1876–1877 and 1887–1889.

See also 
 List of bishops of the Reformed Episcopal Church

References 

Attribution

External links 
 The Reformed Episcopal Church 1874 sermon by Cheney
 The Evangelical Ideal of a Visible Church 1875 sermon by Cheney
 Primitive Episcopacy sermon by Cummins at Cheney's consecration
 Biographical article

People from Canandaigua, New York
1836 births
1916 deaths
American Reformed Episcopalians
Presiding Bishops of the Reformed Episcopal Church